Olga Peredery (born 12 April 1994) is a former Ukrainian handball player for the Ukrainian national team.

References

1994 births
Living people
Ukrainian female handball players
Sportspeople from Zaporizhzhia
Ukrainian expatriate sportspeople in Russia
Ukrainian expatriate sportspeople in Slovakia
Ukrainian expatriate sportspeople in Slovenia
Ukrainian expatriate sportspeople in France